"Fearless" is the debut single recorded by South Korean girl group Le Sserafim for their debut extended play (EP) of the same name. It was released as the EP's lead single by Source Music on May 2, 2022. The Japanese version was pre-released as digital single on December 15, 2022 and was released on January 25, 2023, as the group's Japanese debut single by EMI Records and Universal Music Japan.

Background and release
On March 14, 2022, Source Music announced it would be debuting a new girl group in collaboration with Hybe Corporation. A week later, Hybe Corporation announced the group would be debuting in May. On April 13, it was announced the group would be releasing their debut extended play Fearless on May 2. On April 25, the track listing was released with "Fearless" announced as the lead single. Two days later, the highlight medley video was released. The music videos teaser was released on April 29 and May 1, respectively. On November 25, it was announced the group would be releasing the Japanese-version of "Fearless" as part of their Japanese debut on January 25, 2023.

Composition
"Fearless" was written and composed by Score (13), Megatone (13), Supreme Boi, Blvsh, Jaro, Nikolay Mohr, "Hitman" Bang, Oneye, Josefin Glenmark, Emmy Kasai, Kyler Niko, Pau, and Destiny Rogers. Musically, the song was described as funk-based alternative pop and dance-pop song with lyrics that "tells the story of moving forward without being shaken by the past". "Fearless" was composed in the key of G major, with a tempo of 104 beats per minute.

Commercial performance
"Fearless" debuted at number 85 on South Korea's Gaon Digital Chart in the chart issue dated May 1–7, 2022; on its component charts, the song debuted at number 19 on the Gaon Download Chart, number 94 on the Gaon Streaming Chart, and number 65 on the Gaon BGM Chart. It ascended to number ten on the Gaon Download Chart in the following week, and number 12 on the Gaon Digital Chart, and number nine on the Gaon Streaming Chart in the chart issue dated May 22–28, 2022. On the Billboard South Korea Songs, "Fearless" debuted at number 11 in the chart issue dated May 14, 2022, ascending to number four in the chart issue dated May 28, 2022.

In New Zealand, the song debuted at number 27 on the RMNZ Hot Singles in the chart issue dated May 9, 2022. In Japan, the song debuted at number nine on the Billboard Japan Japan Hot 100 in the chart issue dated May 11, 2022; on its component charts, it debuted at number 12 on the Top Download Songs, and Top Streaming Songs, and number four on the Top User Generated Songs. It ascended to number six on the Billboard Japan Top Streaming Songs in the following week. On the Oricon Combined Singles, the song debuted at number 13 in the chart issue dated May 16, 2022.

In Singapore, the song debuted at number eight on the RIAS Top Streaming Chart in the chart issue dated May 6–12, 2022, and peaked at number seven in the following week. The song also debuted at number 13 on the RIAS Top Regional Chart in the chart issue dated April 29 – May 5, 2022, ascending to number four in the following week. On the Billboard Singapore Songs, the song debuted at 11 in the chart issue dated May 21, 2022. In Malaysia, the song debuted at number 12 on the Billboard Malaysia Songs in the chart issue dated May 21, 2022. It also peaked at number eight on the RIM International Singles Streaming Chart in the chart issue dated May 13–19, 2022. In Taiwan, the song debuted at number 14 on the Billboard Taiwan Songs in the chart issue dated May 21, 2022. In Indonesia, the song debuted at number 20 on the Billboard Indonesia Songs in the chart issue dated May 21, 2022, ascending to number 19 in the following week. On the Billboard Vietnam Hot 100, the song debuted at number 65 in the chart issue dated May 12, 2022, ascending to number 36 in the following week.

In United States, the song debuted at number 14 on the Billboard World Digital Song Sales in the chart issue dated May 14, 2022, ascending to number 12 in the following week. Globally, the song debuted at number 155 on the Billboard Global 200, and number 74 on the Billboard Global Excl. U.S. in the chart issue dated May 14, 2022. It ascended to number 69 on the Billboard Global 200, and number 48 on the Billboard Global Excl. U.S. in the following week.

The Japanese version of the single debuted at the top of the daily ranking of the Oricon Singles Chart on its first day with 132,621 physical copies sold. It ended up at no. 1 on the weekly Oricon Singles Chart with 222,286 units sold, while Billboard Japan recorded 321,717 sales from January 23–29, 2023. The single was later certified double platinum by the Recording Industry Association of Japan (RIAJ) for selling over 500,000 units.

Promotion
Following the release of Fearless, Le Sserafim held a live showcase on the same date to introduce the extended play and communicate with their fans. The group performed "Fearless" along with "Blue Flame" during the showcase. They subsequently performed on three music programs: Mnet's M Countdown on May 5, and KBS's Music Bank on May 6, and SBS's Inkigayo on May 8. On the second week, they performed on five music programs: SBS MTV's The Show on May 10, MBC M's Show Champion on May 11, Mnet's M Countdown on May 12, KBS's Music Bank on May 13, and SBS's Inkigayo on May 15, where they won first place for their appearance on The Show and Music Bank. On the third week, they performed on The Show on May 17 where they won first place. On the fifth week, they performed on Show Champion on June 1 where they won first place.

The Japanese version of "Fearless" was performed on the 73rd NHK Kōhaku Uta Gassen music program on New Year's Eve, 2022.

Accolades

Music Bank controversy
Le Sserafim's win on the May 13 broadcast of KBS's Music Bank was met with controversy after allegations of score manipulation surfaced. According to Segye Ilbo, the program received complaints regarding fellow first place nominee Lim Young-woong's score of zero in the broadcast category. The program initially claimed that his song "If We Ever Meet Again" was not played on any of their digital content, therefore accumulating zero points in the category; however, it was pointed out that it was in fact played on several KBS Radio stations. On August 24, producers of the show were charged for manipulating scores. On February 10, 2023 the police investigation concluded that KBS were not guilty and that Le Sserafim rightfully won their 1st place trophy on Music Bank during the May 13, 2022 broadcast.

Track listing

 CD single / digital download / streaming (Japanese version)
 "Fearless" (Japanese version) – 2:48
 "Blue Flame" (Japanese version) – 3:21
 "Choices" – 3:21
 DVD (Japanese version – limited B)
 "Fearless" (Japanese version) (music video) – 2:54
 "Fearless" (Japanese version) (MV & jacket shoot sketch)

Charts

Weekly charts

Monthly charts

Year-end charts

Certifications

Release history

See also
 List of Music Bank Chart winners (2022)
 List of Show Champion Chart winners (2022)
 List of The Show Chart winners (2022)

References

2022 debut singles
2022 songs
Le Sserafim songs
Korean-language songs
Hybe Corporation singles
Billboard Japan Hot 100 number-one singles
Oricon Weekly number-one singles
Songs written by Bang Si-hyuk